Javier Castellano (born October 23, 1977, in Maracaibo, Zulia State, Venezuela) is a jockey in American Thoroughbred horse racing.

Castellano began his riding career in 1996 at Santa Rita and La Rinconada racecourses in Venezuela. In June 1997 he moved to the United States where he rode at race tracks in southern Florida until 2001 when he moved to race on the New York State racing circuit.  He had his first major wins in 2004, on Frank Stronach's colt Ghostzapper and won several major races including the 2004 Breeders' Cup Classic, earning 2004 Eclipse Award for Horse of the Year and other honors. In 2006, Castellano rode Bernardini for Mohammed bin Rashid Al Maktoum's Darley Racing, winning the Preakness Stakes, the Travers Stakes, and the Jockey Club Gold Cup.

Castellano received the Eclipse Award for Outstanding Jockey in 2013, 2014, 2015, and 2016 each time based on having the highest purse winnings of any jockey in North America. In 2013, he finished the year with purse earnings of over $26.2 million, surpassing the single-season record previously held by Ramon Dominguez in 2012. He passed 4,000 North American wins in February 2015, and by the end of the year had broken his own single-season winnings and earnings record.

Javier Castellano was selected as a 2017 inductee into the National Museum of Racing and Hall of Fame, with the formal ceremony scheduled for August 4 in Saratoga Springs, New York.

Racing runs in Castellano's family. His father, who died in 2000, his uncle and a brother all have been jockeys. He considers his father to be the biggest influence on his career.

, he and his wife Abby have three children. His father-in-law is Terry Meyocks, national director of the Jockeys' Guild.  His younger brother Abel Castellano, Jr. (born 1983) is also a jockey and rode his first winner on September 22, 1999, at Santa Rita Race Course in Venezuela. In 2000 he began riding in the United States at Gulfstream Park.

Year-end charts

References

 Javier Castellano's profile at the NTRA

External links
Official Website

1977 births
Living people
Sportspeople from Maracaibo
Eclipse Award winners
Venezuelan expatriate sportspeople in the United States
Venezuelan jockeys